Questionnaire (1927–1950) was an American Thoroughbred racehorse bred and raced by James Butler, president and owner of Empire City Race Track, who owned his sire Sting and grandsire Spur.

Questionnaire was race conditioned by Andy Schuttinger, who was his trainer through 1930, after which Edward J. Bennett took over.

Questionnaire had an outstanding year at age three. Although he did not run in the first two legs of the 1930 U.S. Triple Crown series, he finished third to Triple Crown champion Gallant Fox in the Belmont Stakes. Overall, he won nine important races in 1930  and then in 1931 captured the prestigious Brooklyn, Empire City and Metropolitan Handicaps.

At stud
After two more important wins in 1932 at age five, Questionnaire was retired to stud for owner James Butler. However, Butler died in 1934 and his estate sold Questionnaire at auction. He was purchased for $15,000 by  Helen Hay Whitney's Greentree Stud, Inc. for whom he served stallion duty at their breeding farm in Lexington, Kentucky.  Among the successful runners he sired was Stefanita, the 1943 American Champion Three-Year-Old Filly, and multiple stakes winners Hash (1936), Requested (1939), Coincidence (1942), Carolyn A. (1944), and Double Brandy (1946).

Questionnaire died of colic at age twenty-three on August 25, 1950.

Pedigree

References

1927 racehorse births
1950 racehorse deaths
Racehorses bred in Kentucky
Racehorses trained in the United States
Thoroughbred family 2-o